Adam Rankin "Stovepipe" Johnson (February 6, 1834 – October 20, 1922) was an antebellum Western frontiersman and later an officer in the Confederate States Army during the American Civil War. Johnson obtained notoriety leading the Newburgh Raid using a force of only about 35 men. Johnson and his men confiscated supplies and ammunition without a shot being fired by tricking Newburgh's defenders into thinking the town was surrounded by cannons. In reality, the so-called cannons were an assemblage of a stove pipe, a charred log, and wagon wheels, forever giving the Confederate commander the nickname of Adam "Stovepipe" Johnson. Permanently blinded during a skirmish in 1864, Johnson in 1887 founded the town of Marble Falls, Texas, which became known as "the blind man's town."

Early life
Johnson was born in Henderson, Kentucky, a son of Thomas J. and Juliet (Rankin) Johnson. Educated in the local schools, he went to work at age 12 in a drugstore for the next eight years. In 1854 he moved to Hamilton Valley in Burnet County, Texas, and worked as a surveyor on the West Texas frontier. He was a noted Indian fighter and provided supplies and animals for the Butterfield Overland Mail stations. On January 1, 1861, he married Josephine Eastland of Austin, with whom he had nine children.

Civil War
When the Civil War began and his native Kentucky struggled to maintain its neutrality, Johnson returned home and joined Nathan B. Forrest's cavalry battalion as a scout, fighting with him at his first engagement at the Battle of Sacramento. He escaped capture with Forrest after Fort Donelson, when the Confederate commanders decided to surrender their post to the Union besiegers. He later received a promotion to colonel in recognition of his exploits with his 10th Kentucky Partisan Rangers, a regiment he raised that often operated deep behind Federal lines in Kentucky. Johnson's men harassed Union supply lines and attacked isolated garrisons. In July 1862, in his Newburgh Raid, Johnson captured the town of Newburgh, Indiana, bluffing its sizable Union militia force into surrendering with only twelve of his men and a stovepipe mounted and a burnt black log on the running gears of an abandoned wagon to form a Quaker cannon. His capture of the first Northern city to fall to the Confederates made the news even in Europe, and Johnson's men thereafter nicknamed him "Stovepipe".

In 1863, Johnson assumed command of a brigade in the cavalry division of Brig. Gen. John Hunt Morgan. He reluctantly participated in Morgan's Raid, though he was only supposed to raid on the Kentucky side of the river. Following the Confederate disaster at the Battle of Buffington Island, Johnson led nearly 350 of his men across the rain-swollen Ohio River to safety. The remainder of Morgan's division was trapped on the Ohio side of the river and eventually forced to surrender.

Johnson was appointed brigadier general on September 6, 1864, to rank from June 1, 1864, though his appointment was never confirmed by the Confederate Congress. On August 21, 1864, he was blinded by an accidental shot from one of his own men during a skirmish at Grubb's Crossroads, near Princeton, Kentucky. Left behind because of his injuries, he was captured by the Federals and was a prisoner for much of the remainder of the war in Fort Warren. He was exchanged near the war's end, and despite his blindness attempted to return to active duty. However, the final surrender put a stop to that.

Postbellum
Adam R. Johnson returned to Texas after being exchanged and paroled in 1865. Although blind, he founded a town, established a company, and worked to harness the water power of the Colorado River. One of his sons was Rankin Johnson Sr., a former Major League pitcher for the Boston Red Sox and St. Louis Cardinals.

He died in Burnet, Texas in 1922 at the age of 88, and is interred at the Texas State Cemetery in Austin, Texas. He rests beside his wife Josephine and near his grandson, Judge George Christian Sr., and a great-grandson, former White House Press Secretary George Christian Jr.

See also

List of American Civil War generals (Acting Confederate)

References

Further reading
 Johnson, Adam Rankin, and William J. Davis. The Partisan Rangers of the Confederate States Army. Louisville, Ky.: G. G. Fetter Company, 1904.

External links

Raid History, Newburgh Museum Foundation

1834 births
1922 deaths
People from Henderson, Kentucky
People from Burnet County, Texas
Confederate States Army brigadier generals
People of Kentucky in the American Civil War
American Civil War prisoners of war
American city founders
Burials at Texas State Cemetery
People from Marble Falls, Texas
Military personnel from Texas